Alberto Pelagotti (born 9 March 1989) is an Italian footballer who plays as a goalkeeper for  club Novara.

Career
Pelagotti started his career with hometown club Empoli, with whom he played at Serie A and Serie B level from 2009 to 2017. After two short stints at Brescia and Arezzo, in 2019 he moved down to Serie D in order to join Palermo following the club refoundation; with the Rosanero, he won two promotions from Serie D to Serie B before leaving the club for good on 30 June 2022, by the end of his contract. He also had to miss a number of games during the 2021–22 after being forced to undergo surgery for a neurofibroma.

After a few months without a club, on 4 February 2023 he joined Serie C club Novara until the end of the 2022–23 season.

Career statistics

Club

References

External links
 legaserieb profile

1989 births
People from Empoli
Footballers from Tuscany
Living people
Italian footballers
Italy youth international footballers
Association football goalkeepers
Empoli F.C. players
Manfredonia Calcio players
Pisa S.C. players
Brescia Calcio players
S.S. Arezzo players
Palermo F.C. players
Novara F.C. players
Serie A players
Serie B players
Serie C players
Serie D players
Sportspeople from the Metropolitan City of Florence